Aphelia may refer to:

 Aphelia (moth), a genus of moths in the Tortricidae
 Aphelia (plant), a genus of plants in the Centrolepidaceae
 Aphelia, a character in The Fatal Contract, a play by William Heminges
 Aphelia, an album by German rock band Scream Silence
 Aphelia (rhetoric), the plainness in writing or speech
 the plural of aphelion, the point in a solar orbit most distant from the sun

Genus disambiguation pages